Upper Woodstock is a rural locality in the local government area (LGA) of Huon Valley in the South-east LGA region of Tasmania. The 2016 census recorded a population of 71 for the state suburb of Upper Woodstock.

History 
Upper Woodstock was gazetted as a locality in 1971.

Geography
Most of the boundaries are survey lines.

Road infrastructure 
Route C621 (Pelverata Road) runs through from north-west to north.

References

Towns in Tasmania
Localities of Huon Valley Council